The Hanoi Hilton is a 1987 Vietnam War film which focuses on the experiences of American prisoners of war who were held in the infamous Hoa Lo Prison in Hanoi during the 1960s and 1970s and the story is told from their perspectives. It was directed by Lionel Chetwynd, and stars Michael Moriarty, Ken Wright and Paul Le Mat. Music was done by Jimmy Webb.

The film portrays fictional characters, not specific American POWs.  It earned less than $1 million in its initial theatrical release, but a Warner Home Video VHS release gained a cult following, especially among veterans.

A DVD release of the film had been anticipated for some time in 2008, with the package to include a new interview with former POW and 2008 presidential candidate John McCain. However, the film's release was suspended by Warner Bros. when he became the Republican Party nominee. The week following the 2008 United States presidential election, Warner Bros. went ahead with the DVD release.

Plot 

A group of American POWs held inside Hanoi's Hoa Lo Prison during the Vietnam War endure some brutal lessons in the art of survival and find dignity in the bargain.

Cast 
 Michael Moriarty as LCDR Williamson
 John Edwin Shaw as Mason
 Ken Wright as Kennedy
 Paul Le Mat as Earl Hubman
 David Soul as Major Oldham
 Stephen Davies as Captain Robert Miles
 Lawrence Pressman as Colonel Cathcart
 Doug Savant as Ashby
 David Anthony Smith as Gregory
 Jeffrey Jones as Major Fischer
 John Vargas as Oliviera
 Rick Fitts as Captain Turner
 John Diehl as Murphy
 Jesse Dabson as Rasmussen
 Bruce Fairbairn as Shavik
 James Acheson as Cummins
 Aki Aleong as Major Ngo Doc
 Gary Guidinger as Raymond
 Mark Kemble as Jesse
 Marii Mak as Voice of Hanoi Hilton (voice)
 Natalie Alexander as Mrs. Fischer (uncredited)

Reception 
On Metacritic, the film has a weighted average score of 32 out of 100, based on 10 critics, indicating "generally unfavorable reviews".

References

External links 

1987 films
1980s war drama films
American war drama films
Films about shot-down aviators
Films set in Hanoi
Golan-Globus films
Vietnam War prisoner of war films
Films produced by Menahem Golan
Films produced by Yoram Globus
1980s English-language films
1980s American films